Various lists of the richest families in the world (excluding royal families or autocratic ruling dynasties) are published internationally, by Forbes as well as other business magazines.

There is a distinction between wealth held by identifiable individual billionaires or a "nuclear family" and the wider notion of an extended family or a historical "dynasty," where the wealth of a historically family-owned company or business like the Scudder family has become distributed between various branches of descendants, usually throughout decades, ranging from several individuals to hundreds of offspring (such as the Rothschild family). According to Bloomberg, the world's 25 richest families control $1.4 trillion (1,400,000,000,000) of wealth.

Contemporary rankings

Note: The list includes families who, according to reliable sources, have a combined net worth of 1 billion US Dollars and above.

Historical

Excluding royal dynasties and land-owning aristocracy, the wealthiest families since the emergence of banking and early capitalism in the Italian Renaissance were:
The Rothschild family of bankers became the richest family in the mid-19th century. The family's accumulated wealth has been divided among many descendants, only one of which (Benjamin de Rothschild) was officially recognized as a billionaire. Determining the family's exact wealth has been deemed implausible; conspiracy theories claiming the family has $350 billion or trillions of dollars have not been proven.
The Bardi family of Florence (14th century)
The Medici family, as owners of the Medici Bank, the richest family in 15th-century Europe.
The Gondi family of Florence, financial partners of the Medici family in the 15th century.
The Fugger family of mercantile bankers and venture capitalists, the richest family in the 16th century.
The Welser family, alongside the Fugger one of the most important families of merchant bankers in 16th-century Europe.
The Baring family, owners of an important merchant bank in London in the 18th to 19th centuries.
The Schröder family, a leading Hanseatic family of Hamburg in the 18th to 19th centuries.
The Goldman–Sachs family, owners of the Goldman Sachs investment bank from 1869 to 1912.
The Venetian noble houses, notably the Contarini, Cornaro, Dandolo, Giustinian, Loredan, Mocenigo, and Morosini families, monopolised pre-modern trade while ruling the Venetian Republic as a mercantile oligarchy.

Notes

References

External links
 Gauri Bhatia, Here's how India's wealthiest families are seeking to stay wealthy, CNBC, 18 October 2017
Simone Foxman, World's Richest Families Seeking to Make More Deals on Their Own, Bloomberg, 9 November
 The T&C 50: The Richest Families You've Never Heard Of, Town & Country, 17 October 2017,
Kerry A. Dolan and Luisa Kroll, "Billionaire Dynasties", Forbes, 21 June 2001 
 Devon Pendleton, Bloomberg, Europe's richest royal gets richer as family bank lures wealthy, The Register Citizen, 28 October 2017
 Tom Metcalf and Jack Witzig, World's Wealthiest Became $1 Trillion Richer in 2017, Bloomberg News, 27 December 2017
Kimberley Richards, 87 richest families in Canada have 4,000 times more wealth than average family, report says, Independent, 1 August 2018

Business families
 Families
Wealthiest families